Lethbridge Iron Works Co. Ltd. is an iron foundry based in Lethbridge, Alberta, Canada. Founded in 1898, it is one of the oldest businesses in Lethbridge.

External links
 Official site

Companies based in Lethbridge
Manufacturing companies established in 1898
Ironworks and steel mills in Canada
1898 establishments in Alberta